The Western Boyacá Province is a province of the Colombian Department of Boyacá. The province is formed by 15 municipalities. The province hosts the western belt of the rich emerald deposits of Boyacá.

Municipalities 
Briceño • Buenavista • Caldas • Chiquinquirá • Coper • La Victoria • Maripí • Muzo • Otanche • Pauna • Quipama • Saboyá • San Miguel de Sema • San Pablo de Borbur • Tununguá

References 

Provinces of Boyacá Department